Liu Meng may refer to:

Liu Meng (field hockey) (born 1995), Chinese field hockey player
Liu Meng (table tennis) (born 1996), Chinese para table tennis player